The 2015 Recopa Sudamericana was the 23rd edition of the Recopa Sudamericana, the football competition organized by CONMEBOL between the winners of the previous season's two major South American club tournaments, the Copa Libertadores and the Copa Sudamericana.

The competition was contested in two-legged home-and-away format between Argentine teams San Lorenzo, the 2014 Copa Libertadores champion, and River Plate, the 2014 Copa Sudamericana champion. The first leg was hosted by River Plate at Estadio Antonio Vespucio Liberti in Buenos Aires on February 6, 2015, while the second leg was hosted by San Lorenzo at Estadio Pedro Bidegain in Buenos Aires on February 11, 2015.

River Plate won both legs 1–0, with Carlos Sánchez scoring both goals, to win their first Recopa Sudamericana.

Format
The Recopa Sudamericana was played on a home-and-away two-legged basis, with the Copa Libertadores champion hosting the second leg. If tied on aggregate, the away goals rule would not be used, and 30 minutes of extra time would be played. If still tied after extra time, the penalty shoot-out would be used to determine the winner.

Qualified teams

Venues

Matches

First leg

Second leg

References

2015
2015 in South American football
San Lorenzo de Almagro matches
Club Atlético River Plate matches
2015 in Argentine football
2015